Hormurus penta is a species of scorpion in the Hormuridae family. It is native to New Guinea and the Solomon Islands. It was first described in 1991.

References

 

 
penta
Arthropods of New Guinea
Fauna of the Solomon Islands
Animals described in 1991
Taxa named by Wilson R. Lourenço